Christopher Grimm is a New York City-based writer-director and actor.  He wrote, produced, directed and starred in a series of TV promos and movie trailers for the Independent Film Channel based on The Bystander from Hell, a character he created in a short shot on one roll of Super-8 film that played at over 50 film festivals, including Sundance.

He directed the short comedy Looking for Dubinsky, and his 2008 film, Goyband, was his feature-film directorial debut.  Goyband is a musical comedy set in the Catskills starring Adam Pascal, Amy Davidson, Tovah Feldshuh, Natasha Lyonne, Tibor Feldman, Cris Judd, Dean Edwards, Wendy Diamond and CBS Travel Editor Peter Greenberg, and was distributed by MarVista Entertainment.

As a screenwriter he has worked with directors such as Davis Guggenheim and Alan Rudolph.  In addition to writing several award-winning short films, writing credits include the feature-length films Rhythm Thief (winner of numerous festival awards, including a Sundance Jury Prize); Spare Me (winner of the Avignon Prix Tournage) and the documentary Calling the Ghosts (winner of 2 Emmy Awards & a Cable Ace Award).

References

External links
 

American male screenwriters
Living people
Writers from New York City
Year of birth missing (living people)
Film directors from New York City
Screenwriters from New York (state)